Eitel Friedrich von Hohenzollern-Sigmaringen (25 September 1582 – 19 September 1625) was a Roman Catholic Cardinal-Priest and Prince-Bishop of Osnabrück. He was a son of Charles II, Count of Hohenzollern-Sigmaringen and thus a member of the noble and ancient Hohenzollern-Sigmaringen family.  

On the 15 December 1620 Pope Gregory XV created him Cardinal in pectore, he was publicly proclaimed Cardinal-Priest of S. Lorenzo in Panisperna on 11 Jan 1621. He was appointed Prince-Bishop of Osnabrück on 28 April 1623. On the 29 October 1623 he chose to become a priest and was ordained. 

He was never styled Eminence as this was only done after his death in 1630.

References

1582 births
1625 deaths
17th-century German cardinals
Eitel Frederick
Eitel Frederick
Cathedral deans of Cologne
Sons of monarchs